The following is a list of hydroelectric power stations in Portugal.

Map

List

Remarks

See also 

 List of power stations in Portugal
 List of dams and reservoirs in Portugal

References

External links 

 
 
 
 

 
Dams in Portugal
Portugal